Steve Rodehutskors (November 27, 1963 – October 25, 2007) was a Canadian football offensive lineman who played seven seasons in the Canadian Football League (CFL) with the Winnipeg Blue Bombers, BC Lions and Toronto Argonauts. He was drafted by the Blue Bombers in the third round of the 1987 CFL Draft. He played CIS football at the University of Calgary. Rodehutskors was also a member of the Saskatchewan Roughriders

College career
Rodehutskors played CIS football for the Calgary Dinos, winning the 21st Vanier Cup in 1985. He played football with the Strathmore Spartans before his time with the Dinos. Steve also play high school basketball with the Spartans.

Professional career
Rodehutskors was selected by the Winnipeg Blue Bombers of the CFL with the 22nd pick in the 1987 CFL Draft. He played for the Blue Bombers from 1987 to 1991, winning the 76th Grey Cup in 1988 and the 78th Grey Cup in 1990. He signed with the CFL's BC Lions in 1992 and played for them from 1992 to 1993. Rodehutskors was traded to the Toronto Argonauts early in the 1993 season for a first round pick in the 1994 CFL Draft. He was released by the Argonauts before the start of the 1994 season. He signed with the Saskatchewan Roughriders of the CFL during the 1994 off-season and was released by the team prior to the 1994 season.

Personal life
Rodehutskors worked briefly as a stockbroker after his football career before becoming a veterinarian. He died of cancer on October 25, 2007.

References

External links
Just Sports Stats

1963 births
2007 deaths
Players of Canadian football from Alberta
Canadian football offensive linemen
Calgary Dinos football players
Winnipeg Blue Bombers players
BC Lions players
Toronto Argonauts players
Canadian veterinarians
Male veterinarians
Canadian stockbrokers
Canadian football people from Calgary